Rho GDP-dissociation inhibitor 3 is a protein that in humans is encoded by the ARHGDIG gene.

Interactions 

ARHGDIG has been shown to interact with RHOB.

References

External links

Further reading